Elections were held in the Australian state of Queensland on 11 June 1932 to elect the 62 members of the state's Legislative Assembly.

The election was the first electoral test of the Country and Progressive National Party government led by Arthur Edward Moore, and was held in the midst of the Great Depression. Labor had previously held office from 1915 until 1929.

The election resulted in the defeat of the one-term Moore government by the Labor Party, led by William Forgan Smith.

Key dates

Results

The election saw a major swing to Labor from the 1929 election. The election took place on modified boundaries — the Assembly had been reduced by the Electoral Districts Act 1931 from 72 to 62 seats, mainly accomplished by the abolition of sitting Labor members' seats. Despite this, Labor went from a deficit of 16 seats to a surplus of 5 seats.

|}

 525,944 electors were enrolled to vote at the election, but 5 seats (8.1% of the total) were uncontested—4 Labor seats (two more than in 1929) representing 27,083 enrolled voters and one Independent seat (held by Arnold Wienholt) representing 6,825 enrolled voters.

Seats changing party representation

There was an extensive redistribution across Queensland prior to this election, decreasing the amount of seats from 72 to 62. The seat changes are as follows.

Abolished seats

 Members listed in italics did not run for this election.

New seats

Seats changing hands

 Members listed in italics did not recontest their seats.
 In addition, Independent MP Arnold Wienholt held the seat of Fassifern, which he had won from the CPNP at the 1930 by-election.
 The sitting member for Maryborough, John Blackley won this seat from Labor at the 1929 by-election.

Aftermath
Forgan Smith went on to be premier for over 10 years, and Labor held power continuously until the party's split in 1957.

See also
 Members of the Queensland Legislative Assembly, 1929–1932
 Members of the Queensland Legislative Assembly, 1932–1935
 Candidates of the Queensland state election, 1932
 Moore Ministry (Queensland)
 Forgan Smith Ministry

References

Elections in Queensland
1932 elections in Australia
1930s in Queensland
June 1932 events